Namutoni is a restcamp on the edge of Etosha pan in the Oshikoto Region in northern Namibia. It is one of the entrance gates to Etosha National Park.

The most prominent structure at Namutoni is Fort Namutoni, built in 1896. It was originally a German Police post and, as part of the Red Line, a veterinary control point. The Red Line at that time extended to Okaukuejo in the west and Otjituuo in the east. Later Namutoni was used to hold English prisoners in World War I. The original fort was destroyed in 1904 following the Battle of Namutoni and rebuilt a year or two later. Fort Namutoni was declared a National Monument in 1947 by the South West Africa Monuments Council.
The current fort was restored to its present state in 1957 and now largely serves as a lodge, stopover, and view point for visitors to Etosha National Park.

See also 
 Okaukuejo

References 

Etosha National Park
1896 establishments in German South West Africa
National Monuments of Namibia